Pidgey may refer to:

 Pidgey Morgan (1853–1910), American professional baseball player
 Pidgey (Pokémon), a species in the Pokémon franchise

See also 
 Pidge (disambiguation)